An areola is a small colored area of skin, usually around the nipple

Areola or areole (Latin for "small space") may also refer to:

 The open spaces of areolar connective tissue, a type of loose connective tissue
Areolae (diatom), pores in the silica shell of diatoms
Areole, a raised structure bearing spines on cacti
Areola (lichen), a round to polygonal part of a surface of a crustose lichen 
 Areola (entomology), a small ring of color or gap in wing margin of insects- see the Glossary of entomology terms.

Music
 "Areola", a song by 816 Boyz from Tech N9ne's album Sickology 101

People
Alphonse Areola, French footballer

See also
Arreola, a surname
Aureola, a symbolic aura in religious artwork
Arbeloa, a Spanish footballer